Pazze di me is a 2013 Italian comedy film co-written and directed by Fausto Brizzi.

Plot 
The film starts with a flashback of protagonist Andrea's childhood, narrated by adult Andrea musing about his dislike for two particular proverbs. According to the first, there is always a first time, but for Andrea the last times are even more important—such as the last time he saw his father, who left the family in the middle of the night many years ago. According to the other proverb, there are seven women for every man in the world—Andrea has them all at home, and none of them is easy to deal with: his grandmother Matilde, once a professor of astrophysics, is now suffering from dementia and depends her live-in caregiver Bogdana. His mother Vittoria, administrator of 11 condominiums, is the undisputed master of the house and nicknamed Sergeant Hartman (after the Full Metal Jacket character) for her rigorous ways. Then there are his three older sisters: Veronica, the oldest (and the only one to no longer live with her mother), is a convinced feminist with a low opinion of men. Federica, a doctor, is notoriously disorganized. She changes men every other week and habitually makes poor choices in doing so. Beatrice, who became a notary at age 22 (at the same time winning four consecutive wet T-shirt contests), is a perfectionist with a tendency to alienate people with her arrogance.

Andrea grew up being second fiddle to his older sisters. Looking for permanent employment, he is supporting himself with occasional jobs. While working in a bar, he has met Roberta. However, six months into their relationship, as she is spending the night at Andrea's place and the various family members walk in on the couple at night, make them cancel a planned beach so Andrea can run some errands, criticize Roberta's cooking, destroy the computer on which Roberta had been writing her thesis, scratch her car and have it towed for being parked in front of the family's garage, and exchange her dog for another by mistake, Roberta breaks up with Andrea and storms out in anger. She leaves behind the dog, a female and now the seventh “woman” in Andrea's life.

Beatrice is left by her fiancé at the altar, who claims he can no longer bear a woman as flawless as her, and destroying Andrea's hope of another sister moving out. Beatrice falls into a deep depression and refuses to change out of her wedding dress.

While delivering pizza to the house of a woman named Giulia and her boyfriend Paolo, he walks in on a heated argument. Giulia ends up leaving Paolo for Andrea, but to avoid losing yet another girlfriend over his difficult family, Andrea claims to be an orphan. After several near-encounters with his family, he is eventually unmasked. Giulia forgives him and is introduced to his family. As Giulia and Andrea spend time at a spa, they discover that Veronica has started an affair with a married man no other than Giulia's father. Nonetheless, Giulia's parents celebrate their wedding anniversary, to which they invite Andrea's entire family. After Andrea's sisters ruin the party, Giulia demands that Andrea decide between her and her family. Andrea declares to his family that he is leaving, packs his bags and heads for Giulia's home. But after an unexpected encounter with his father, who does not even recognize his own son, he decides to “fix” his family before leaving for good. He encourages Federica's assistant (and potential father of the child she is expecting) to make a move towards her, and does the same to the concierge of the condominium, who has long held feelings for Vittoria but never had the courage to make a move. He provokes an argument between Veronica and Riccardo, causing the two to break up and making Veronica to realize Riccardo was never interested in a serious relationship with her. By showing Beatrice some childhood movies, he makes her realize how she has alienated other people from childhood on. After a harmonic family Christmas, he returns for Giulia, only to find that Paolo has since moved back in with her. He goes on to live on his own, and one day bumps into Roberta in a supermarket. The two decide to give it another try. Just then Andrea gets another call from his mother, but he puts the phone into a crate of lemons and walks off with Roberta.

As the end credits roll, Andrea's phone receives several text messages from his family, announcing new disasters: Matilde hit a cop with her electric wheelchair and escaped, Federica has forgotten her baby at the supermarket (right after the message arrives, a loudspeaker announcement about an abandoned baby is heard in the background), Beatrice announces suicide after discovering a white hair, Veronica has fallen in love with Roberta's father, Andrea's father has returned to the family.

Cast  
 
 Francesco Mandelli as Andrea Morelli
 Loretta Goggi as  Vittoria Morelli
 Chiara Francini as  Beatrice Luisa Elisabetta Morelli
 Claudia Zanella as  Veronica Morelli
 Marina Rocco as  Federica Morelli
 Valeria Bilello as  Giulia
 Lucia Poli as Grandma Matilde Morelli
 Paola Minaccioni as  Bogdana
 Margherita Vicario as  Roberta
 Fabrizio Biggio as  Luca
 Luca Argentero as  Corrado
 Gioele Dix as Riccardo 
 Alessandro Tiberi as  Maurizio 
 Pif as  Ludovico 
 Maurizio Micheli as  Marcello
 Flavio Insinna as  Andrea's Father
 Edi Angelillo as Maria Paola

See also
 List of Italian films of 2013

References

External links

2013 comedy films
2013 films
Italian comedy films
Films directed by Fausto Brizzi
Films scored by Bruno Zambrini